Darlene Alice Quaife (née Barry) (born September 1, 1948 in Calgary, Alberta) is a Canadian novelist. Her first novel, Bone Bird, won a 1990 Commonwealth Writers Prize, for Best First Book, Canada and the Caribbean.

Quaife was educated at the University of Alberta, from which she received a Master of Arts degree in 1986.
She is a past president of the Writers' Guild of Alberta, and a former director and founding member of Wordfest.

She lives in Priddis, Alberta.

Selected bibliography
Bone Bird, Turnstone Press, 1989, 
Days and Nights on the Amazon, Turnstone Press, 1994, 
Death Writes: A Curious Notebook - 1997; Arsenal Pulp Press, 2002, 
Polar Circus, Turnstone Press, 2001,

References

1948 births
Living people
Canadian women novelists
20th-century Canadian novelists
21st-century Canadian novelists
Writers from Calgary
20th-century Canadian women writers
21st-century Canadian women writers